Ongata Rongai (also known as Ronga in local slang) is a town located in Kajiado North, Kajiado County, Kenya. It lies 1,731 meters (5,682 feet) above sea level. According to the 2019 Census, it is the most populous town in Kajiado County and eleventh largest urban centre by population in Kenya.

Known locally as Rongai or simply Ronga, the populated town is a fast-growing community with an approximate population of 172,590

History
Historically occupied by the Maasai community, the name Ongata Rongai is a Maasai phrase which translates to "narrow plains".

Present-day Ongata Rongai grew from a meeting of a cattle market in the northernmost tip of Kajiado county and the quarry township in present-day Kware. The cattle market and the quarry spread rapidly and joined in the late 1950s.

Due to rapid real estate development starting in the 1990s, Ongata Rongai has evolved into a high-population Nairobi suburb covering around 16 square kilometres. Greater Ongata Rongai is a medium-to-low population area. The neighborhoods of Kandisi, Rimpa, Nkoroi, Merisho, Olekasasi, Tuala, Rangau and Maasai Lodge are located to the south and east of Ongata Rongai.

Ongata Rongai has a diverse population due to its proximity to Nairobi. Ethnic communities represented include Kalenjin, Maasai, Kikuyu, Kamba, Luhya, Luo and Kisii.

One of Rongai's oldest founders is Olekyalosingi

Education
This area is home to a number of institutions of higher learning, such as the Africa Nazarene University, Eagle Air Aviation College, Belmont International College (located at the junction of Magadi/Gataka road in Ongata Rongai Town), Adventist University of Africa, Nairobi Institute of Business Studies (NIBS College) and the nearby Multimedia University of Kenya in Mbagathi. Other learning institutions are Ongata Academy, Laiser Hill Academy, Azuri School Ltd Nkaimurunya Secondary School, Prime Junior School, Nakeel Primary, Nakeel Boys, Arap Moi Primary, Olekasasi Mixed School, and Maxwell Adventist Academy, which together with the Adventist University sit on the property of the headquarters of the Seventh-day Adventist Church for the East-Central African Division. There are also St. Mary's Primary School, Olerai School, P.C.E.A Educational Centre and the latest school in the region, The Champions Academy located at House of Grace Church Ongata Rongai; 300 meters from Laiser Hill School.

Cuisine
Ongata Rongai serves as a primary entry point where most fresh produce is transported directly to the towns from the farms. It has a major market for fresh produce around the area of Kware known as Soko Mjinga. The large number of butcheries across Ongata Rongai also bear testimony to the popularity of meat and precisely nyama choma. Sellers of fresh fish are also making their presence felt, citing its immense benefits to the health of consumers.

Urban Culture

Rongai is popular for its pimped matatu's. Matatu's are the main mode of public transport in most urban areas in Kenya. Matatus in Nairobi are identified by a route number, the route number for Rongai is 125 and they operate from a terminus in Nairobi CBD along Moi Avenue next to Haille Selassie roundabout. Rongai matatus are very colorful and are decorated with graffiti representing the latest or popular pop culture: artists, brands or anything trending. Interior is decorated with flashy lights, multiple TV screens and speakers that entertain the commuters with very loud music, there is also free WIFI onboard and mobile charging ports.

Foreigners and tourists usually refer to them as moving discos or night clubs on wheels. Matatus are a part of Nairobi's urban culture, you can not visit the city of Nairobi and fail to ride in a Rongai matatu for an experience of a lifetime. 

Some popular matatus that have operated in Rongai are: Catalyst (which won the Best Matatu of the year at Nganya Awards 2016), Boombox, Bond 007, Shakur, Bumblebee, Batman and Superman, Emperor, Amaru, Phantom e.t.c Rongai also won the best route at the Nganya Awards event.

Sports

The town has several sports grounds like Nakel Stadium which is an arena for Men and  women's football. The stadium is still under renovation.

There is amateur boxing, taekwondo, judo and kungfu at the social hall. However, there is a shortage of equipment for these combat sports. Fitness facilities are available as are several fields for jogging and other outdoor fitness.

See also
 Githurai
 Kahawa
 Kasarani
 Dandora
 Kiserian
 Kitengela
 Ruiru

References 

Populated places in Kajiado County